Wangenried is a municipality in the Oberaargau administrative district in the canton of Bern in Switzerland.

Geography

Of this area, 67.9% is used for agricultural purposes, while 24.1% is forested. Of the rest of the land, 6.9% is settled (buildings or roads) and the remainder (1%) is non-productive (rivers, glaciers or mountains).

Demographics
, 3.5% of the population was made up of foreign nationals. Over the last 10 years the population has grown at a rate of 6.1%. Most of the population speaks German  (97.9%), with Italian being second most common ( 0.8%) and French being third ( 0.5%).

In the 2007 election the most popular party was the SVP which received 53.1% of the vote.  The next three most popular parties were the SPS (17.4%), the FDP (10.8%) and the local small left-wing parties (6.6%).

The age distribution of the population is children and teenagers (0–19 years old) make up 23% of the population, while adults (20–64 years old) make up 61.3% and seniors (over 64 years old) make up 15.7%.  In Wangenried about 76.9% of the population (between age 25-64) have completed either non-mandatory upper secondary education or additional higher education (either university or a Fachhochschule).  

Wangenried has an unemployment rate of 0.66%.  , there were 36 people employed in the primary economic sector and about 13 businesses involved in this sector.  46 people are employed in the secondary sector and there are 3 businesses in this sector.  42 people are employed in the tertiary sector, with 7 businesses in this sector.

References

Municipalities of the canton of Bern